Taylor Head Beach is a provincial park on the Eastern Shore of Nova Scotia, Canada.

The trails are rugged. There are also many geological features and natural habitats within the park. Taylor Head Beach is one of the few places in Nova Scotia that has sand volcanoes. Hunting is forbidden inside the park borders. Two or three sailors drowned off the coast of Taylor Head and are buried there. There is a sign at their place of burial.

Trails

References

External links 
 Detailed history of Taylor Head Beach 
 Friends of Taylor Head Provincial Park

Provincial parks of Nova Scotia
Parks in Halifax, Nova Scotia